Keivan Ghanbarzadeh (born 26 May 1990) is an Iranian high jumper.

He competed at the 2007 World Youth Championships without reaching the final. On the regional level he finished fourth at the 2009 Asian Championships, eighth at the 2010 Asian Games, won the silver medals at the 2010 Asian Indoor Championships and 2018 Asian Indoor Championships , finished sixth at the 2011 Asian Championships, sixth again at the 2011 Summer Universiade and won a silver medal at the 2013 Asian Championships.

His personal best is 2.26 metres, achieved in April 2012 in Shiraz. This is the Iranian record.

References

1990 births
Living people
Iranian male high jumpers
Athletes (track and field) at the 2010 Asian Games
Athletes (track and field) at the 2014 Asian Games
Asian Games competitors for Iran
Competitors at the 2011 Summer Universiade
21st-century Iranian people